Major General Juha Kilpiä (born in 1953), a native of Finland, served as Head of Mission and Chief of Staff of the United Nations Truce Supervision Organization (UNTSO). He was appointed to this position by the United Nations Secretary-General Ban Ki-moon on 25 March 2011.

Prior to his appointment to UNTSO, Major General Kilpiä served as Chief of Staff of the Army Command Finland from 2009 to 2011, and as the Military Representative of Finland to the European Union and the North Atlantic Treaty Organization (NATO) in Brussels prior to that.

He has also collected extensive experience through a number of posts he held in UN peacekeeping missions. He was the Chief of Operations in United Nations peacekeeping operations, the United Nations Interim Force in Lebanon (UNIFIL) in 1991. In 1993, he was the Chief of the United Nations Disengagement Observer Force (UNDOF), where he worked closely with UNTSO Military Observers.

Major General Kilpiä attended the Finnish War College from 1985 to 1987. He also took a number of other programmes at the United Nations, the NATO School in Germany and the NATO Defense College in Italy.

Major General Kilpiä is married with one daughter.

External links
United Nations Press Release

1953 births
Living people
Finnish military personnel
United Nations military personnel
Finnish officials of the United Nations